Guangdong-Hong Kong Cup 1989–90 is the 12th staging of this two-leg competition between Hong Kong and Guangdong.

The first leg was played in Hong Kong Stadium on 6 January 1990 while the second leg was played in Guangzhou on 13 January 1990.

Hong Kong gained the champion by winning an aggregate 2–1 against Guangdong.

Squads

Hong Kong
Some of players in the squad include:
 Lau Tong Ping 劉棟平
 Cheung Chi Tak 張志德
 Chan Ping On 陳炳安
 Wong Kwok On 黃國安
 Chan Wai Chiu 陳偉超
 Law Wai Chi 羅偉志
 Leslie George Santos 山度士
 Ku Kam Fai 顧錦輝
 Lai Wing Cheong 黎永昌
 Tim Bredbury 巴貝利 
 Chow Chi Shing 周志成
 Ng Kam Hung 吳鑑鴻
 Chu Yu Tai 朱雨大

Guangdong
Some of players in the squads include:
 Guo Yijun 郭億軍
 Li Chaoyang 李朝陽

Trivia
 It is the first time for Hong Kong to win the champion in consecutive time.

Results
First Leg

Second Leg

References
 HKFA website 省港盃回憶錄(六) (in chinese)

 

Guan
1989-90
1990 in Chinese football